Vincent in Brixton is a 2002 play by Nicholas Wright. The play premiered at London's National Theatre with Jochum ten Haaf in the title role. It transferred to the Playhouse Theatre and later to Broadway.

It focuses on artist Vincent van Gogh's time in Brixton, London in 1873. In the play, which is largely fictional, he falls in love with an English widow. It was revived by The Original Theatre Company in 2009.

Characters
 Ursula
 Eugenie
 Anna
 Vincent
 Sam

Awards and nominations 
 Awards
 2003 Laurence Olivier Award for Best New Play
Nominations
 2003 Tony Award for Best Play

References

Further reading

External links
 
 
 

2003 plays
Broadway plays
Laurence Olivier Award-winning plays
Plays by Nicholas Wright
Cultural depictions of Vincent van Gogh
West End plays
Brixton
Plays set in the 19th century